Caroline Bohé (born 23 July 1999) is a Danish racing cyclist. She rode in the women's road race event at the 2018 UCI Road World Championships.

Major results
2022
 UCI XCC World Cup
3rd Leogang

 10th UCI Esports World Championships

References

External links
 

1999 births
Living people
Danish female cyclists
Place of birth missing (living people)
Cyclists at the 2020 Summer Olympics
Olympic cyclists of Denmark
21st-century Danish women